Chronicles II is the second of a two parts re-recorded hits compilation by German rock band Eloy. The album has been released in 1994 to commemorate the 25th anniversary of the band. The first part Chronicles I has been released the preceding year. 

Chronicles II contains songs from the years 1984-1992 and from the albums Metromania (1984), Ra (1988) and Destination (1992). 

Tracks from Metromania have been re-recorded with former members of the band to match modern sound quality. All tracks have been digitally remastered.

Track listing 
All tracks by Eloy

 "Escape to the Heights" - 5:10 (from Metromania)
 "All Life is One" - 6:29 (from Metromania)
 "Nightriders" - 4:37 (from Metromania)
 "Follow the Light" - 9:47 (from Metromania)
 "Rainbow" - 4:37 (from Ra)
 "Voyager of the Future Race" - 6:28 (from Ra)
 "Fire & Ice" - 5:09 (from Destination)
 "Call of the Wild" - 7:00 (from Destination)
 "Prisoner in Mind" - 4:26 (from Destination)
 "Eclipse of Mankind" - 6:28 (from Destination)

Personnel 

 Frank Bornemann - guitar, vocals
 Michael Gerlach - keyboards

Eloy former members playing on this album :

 Klaus-Peter Matziol - bass
 Hannes Arkona - guitar
 Hannes Folberth - keyboards
 Fritz Randow - drums

Additional personnel :

 Nico Baretta - drums on tracks 7-10
 Achim Gieseler - keyboards on "Rainbow"
 Amy, Jane, and Sabine - vocals on "Follow the Light"
 Annette (Joal) Stangenberg - vocals on "Rainbow"

Technical personnel :

 Produced by Frank Bornemann
 Engineered by Gerhard Wolfe
 Remastered by Hans-Jörg Maucksh

References 

Eloy (band) albums
1994 compilation albums